Common names: red-lined earth snake, red-lined shieldtail, Travancore uropeltis.
Uropeltis rubrolineata is a species of nonvenomous shieldtail snake in the family Uropeltidae. The species is endemic to southern India. There are no subspecies that are recognized as being valid.

Geographic range
U. rubrolineata is found in southern India in the Western Ghats: south of the Palghat to Bhimshankar and in the Anaimalai and Travancore Hills.

The original type locality given is "Anamallays, Tinnevellys." Changed to "Tinnevellys, Travancore Hills" by lectotype designation.

Habitat

Description
U. rubrolineata is blackish brown, both dorsally and ventrally. It has a bright red stripe along each side, usually about 2½ scales rows wide, beginning on the labials (both upper and lower).

The dorsal scales are smooth, arranged in 17 rows at midbody, in 19 rows behind the head. The ventrals number 165–172, and the subcaudals number 6–8.

The snout is obtusely pointed. The rostral is about ¼ the length of the shielded part of the head. The portion of the rostral visible from above is as long as its distance from the frontal. The nasals are broadly in contact with each other behind the rostral. The frontal is as long as broad or slightly longer than broad. The eye is small, its diameter slightly less than half the length of the ocular shield. The diameter of the body goes 30 to 33 times into the total length. The ventrals are twice as broad as the contiguous scales. The end of tail is flat dorsally, obliquely truncate, with strongly bicarinate or tricarinate dorsal scales. The terminal scute has a transverse ridge, but no points.

Behaviour
U. rubrolineata is terrestrial and fossorial.

References

Further reading

Ali, S. (1949). "Extension of Range of the Earth Snake Uropeltis rubrolineatus (Günther)". Journal of the Bombay Natural History Society 48 (2): 376.
Beddome, R.H. (1886). "An Account of the Earth-Snakes of the Peninsula of India and Ceylon". Annals and Magazine of Natural History, Fifth Series 17: 3–33. (Silybura rubrolineata, p. 14).
Boulenger, G.A. (1890). The Fauna of British India, Including Ceylon and Burma. Reptilia and Batrachia. London: Secretary of State for India in Council. xviii + 541 pp. (Silybura rubrolineata, pp. 266–267).
Günther, A. (1875). "Second Report on Collections of Indian Reptiles obtained by the British Museum". Proceedings of the Zoological Society of London 1875: 224–234 + Plates XXX–XXXIV. (Silybura rubrolineata, new species, p. 228).
Sharma, R.C. (2003). Handbook: Indian Snakes. Kolkata: Zoological Survey of India. 292 pp. .
Smith, M.A. (1943). The Fauna of British India, Ceylon and Burma, Including the Whole of the Indo-Chinese Sub-region. Reptilia and Amphibia. Vol. III.—Serpentes. London: Secretary of State for India. (Taylor and Francis, printers). xii + 583 pp. (Uropeltis rubrolineatus, new combination, p. 82).

External links

Uropeltidae
Reptiles of India
Endemic fauna of the Western Ghats
Reptiles described in 1875
Taxa named by Albert Günther